Kekec is a fictional children's literature character created by Slovenian author Josip Vandot in 1918. He was first introduced in the serial "Kekec on the Hard Path" in Zvonček magazine (volume 19, issue 1/2). He is a young shepherd boy living in the Julian Alps, revered in Slovenia, and the subject of several films.

List of characters featured in the Kekec novels 
 Kekec (Mežnarčev Gregec) is widely recognized as a Slovenian superhero and cultural icon. Kekec is a brave boy, a fearless shepherd from the highlands of his home region, Kranjska Gora and Julian Alps. He is good guy who is fighting an evil wild hunter from the mountains (Bedanec) and evil herbalist woman from mountains who is stealing children (Pehta).
 Bedanec (or. Bedanc) - evil poacher with long beard from the mountains.
 Mojca - sister of Rožle, captured by Bedanec and Pehta.
 Pehta - wild woman from the mountains.
 Rožle - scared boy, a friend of Kekec.
 Kosobrin - tiny old herbalist.
 Tinkara
 Brincelj
 Vitranc
 Tinka

Vandot's original novels 
Original trilogy short novels with Kekec as the main character were published as annex in Zvonček publication, not in one piece at once but in total 12 parts for each novel:

Novels weren't published in one piece, but every month one or two parts, as Zvonček publication was released at only every first in the month.

Kekec on the Hard Path

Kekec on the Wolf Trail

Kekec Above the Lonely Abyss

Gale's film trilogy 

Jože Gale directed Slovene/Yugoslav film trilogy about Kekec, based on novels by Josip Vandot, but only the first and second film were a direct adaptation of the second and third book:

References

External links 

 
 
 

Fictional Slovenian people
Series of books
Literary characters introduced in 1918
Fictional shepherds